Cornelius Redick is a former wide receiver in the National Football League (NFL).

Biography
Redick was born on January 7, 1964, in Los Angeles, California.

Career
Redick was drafted in the seventh round of the 1986 NFL Draft by the Philadelphia Eagles. He would be a member of the Green Bay Packers during the 1987 NFL season.

He played at the collegiate level at California State University, Fullerton.

See also
List of Green Bay Packers players

References

Players of American football from Los Angeles
Green Bay Packers players
American football wide receivers
Cal State Fullerton Titans football players
Living people
1964 births